"Dragon and Phoenix" is the second of the Dragonlord series by Joanne Bertin and was published in 1999. It takes place in a world of truehumans, truedragons, and dragonlords - beings which have both human and dragon souls and can change from human to dragon and vice versa at will. It was preceded by Dragonlord's Justice, The Last Dragonlord, and is followed by Bard's Oath.

Plot introduction
Dragonlord Linden Rathan and his wife, Maurynna Kyrissean are trying to enjoy the life of newlyweds when a traveller brings a shocking tale to Dragonskeep: the empire of Jehanglan, far to the south, is sustained through the power of a phoenix, bound by the magical power of a truedragon, also trapped and exploited. Learning they must act before the phoenix is due to die and be reborn, Linden, Maurynna, and their mortal and immortal friends launch a daring rescue operation to the reclusive Phoenix Empire.

Meanwhile, in the halls of Jehanglan's imperial palace, a power struggle erupts between Shei-Luin, the emperor's favorite concubine, and Jhanun, the most conservative of the Jehangli nobles. The emperor himself meanwhile, finds himself increasingly swayed into believing the heresies of Shei-Luin's estranged and exiled father: the history of Jehanglan is a lie, and phoenix must be freed.

1999 American novels
American fantasy novels
Tor Books books